During the 2001–02 English football season, Grimsby Town competed in the Football League First Division.

Season summary
During the opening weeks of the 2001–02 season, Grimsby briefly led the First Division, sparking hopes that Lawrence could repeat the promotion success he achieved at Charlton Athletic and Middlesbrough with a much smaller club. One major highlight in the season was when Grimsby picked up a shock 2–1 win over Liverpool in extra time at Anfield in the League Cup thanks to a wonder strike from Phil Jevons in the last minute. However, after a 5–0 heavy loss to Crystal Palace, ambitious promotion hopes were quickly extinguished as Grimsby's form hit a major decline with only one win in their next 18 league games which saw Grimsby sit 23rd in the table and Lawrence was sacked as a result and Paul Groves was named player-manager. Groves brought in Graham Rodger as his assistant and made successful loan signings which included Andy Todd and Martin Pringle both from Charlton and Grimsby's results steadily improved as Groves steered them to safety.

Transfers

Transfers In

Loans In

Transfers Out

Loans Out

Final league table

Results summary

Results by round

Results
Grimsby Town's score comes first

Legend

Football League First Division

FA Cup

Football League Cup

First-team squad
Squad at end of season

Left club during season

Squad statistics

References

External links
 Grimsby Town 2001–02 at Soccerbase.com (select relevant season from dropdown list)

Grimsby Town F.C. seasons
Grimsby Town